Ipirá is a municipality in Bahia, Brazil, with a population of 59,435. It was founded in 1855.

Notable natives 
Eugênio Gomes - Critic and author who won the Prêmio Machado de Assis in 1950.
José Carlos Santos da Silva - Footballer who plays for Club Bolívar.

References

Municipalities in Bahia